Trip to Bhangarh is a 2014 Bollywood horror-thriller film starring Manish Choudhary and Suzanna Mukherjee in the lead roles. It is directed by Jitendra Pawar and produced by Rock N Rolla Films. The music is directed by Onkar Singh. The story heavily influenced by Final Destination.

Plot
In a college reunion party, five friends plan to visit a haunted place called 'Bhangarh' and spend some time together. Unaware about the dangers lurking at this place, they come across a unique history and a number of unknown things about the place. After they come back from the trip, unusual events start taking place with the five friends. They are confused about the motive behind the occurrence of those events. They relate the occurrences with the trip to Bhangarh. They assume that the trip has caused all negative impacts on their lives. Will they be able to find the truth of the events? Is someone else behind everything that is happening in the lives of the five friends?

Cast
 Manish Chaudhary
 Suzanna Mukherjee as  Kavya
 Piyush Raina as Golu
 Rachit Behl as Jadu
 Rohit Chaudhury as Ashu
 Vikram Kochhar as Cheeru
 Parree Pande as Prachi
 Vidushi Mehra as  Priestess
 salim zaidi as mehnat singh hola
 Sudhir Rikhari  as Mangu

References

External links
 

2010s Hindi-language films
2014 films